Leo Gajardo is a retired Chilean association football midfielder who played for the Charlotte Eagles in the USL A-League from 2001 to 2003.

References

1968 births
Living people
Chilean footballers
Chilean expatriate footballers
Charlotte Eagles players
A-League (1995–2004) players
Chilean expatriate sportspeople in the United States
Expatriate soccer players in the United States
Association football midfielders
Association football defenders